E. J. Drayton (born December 13, 1982) is an American former professional basketball player for the Akita Northern Happinets of the Japanese bj league.

College statistics

|-
| style="text-align:left;"| 2003–04
| style="text-align:left;"| Colby
|||  ||  || ||  ||||  || ||  ||  || 
|-
| style="text-align:left;"| 2004–05
| style="text-align:left;"| Charlotte
|29  || 4 || 22.8 ||.367 ||.358  ||.779||4.62  ||1.24 || 0.52 || 0.21 || 8.66
|-
| style="text-align:left;"| 2005–06 
| style="text-align:left;"|Charlotte
| 6 || 2 || 17.7 || .267 || .111 || .571|| 3.33 ||  1.67|| 0.83 || 0.17 || 4.17
|-
| style="text-align:left;"| 2006–07
| style="text-align:left;"| Charlotte
| 30|| 30 || 33.6 ||.482 || .341 || .578 ||8.43  ||1.30 ||0.53  || 0.53 || 13.67
|-
|- class="sortbottom"
! style="text-align:center;" colspan=2|  Career

!65 ||36 || 27.3 ||.425 || .333 ||.641  || 6.26||1.31  || 0.55 ||0.35  || 10.55
|-

Career statistics

Regular season 

|-
| align="left" |  2008–09
| align="left" | Helsinki Seagulls
| 1 ||  || 31.0 || .455 || .500 || .750 || 8.0 || 1.0 || 2.0 || 0.0 || 17.0
|-
| align="left" |  2008–09
| align="left" | Porvoo
| 8 ||  || 31.6 || .485 || .286 || .794 || 9.4 || 0.5 || 0.8 || 0.3 || 18.8
|-
| align="left" |  2010–11
| align="left" | Nahariya
| 13 ||  || 28.6 || .448 || .238 || .682 || 7.4 || 1.1 || 0.7 || 0.8 || 11.1
|-
| align="left" |  2011–12
| align="left" | Akita
| 50 || 16 || 20.9 || .471 || .000 || .629 || 5.6 || 1.3 || 1.0 || 0.7 || 10.4
|-

Playoffs 

|-
|style="text-align:left;"|2011–12
|style="text-align:left;"|Akita
| 4 ||  || 22.0 || .406 || .000 || .500 || 5.0 || 1.5 || 1.0 || 0.3 || 8.0
|-

External links
Charlotte bio
Akita vs Sendai

References

1982 births
Living people
Akita Northern Happinets players
American expatriate basketball people in Finland
American expatriate basketball people in France
American expatriate basketball people in Israel
American expatriate basketball people in Japan
American expatriate basketball people in Portugal
American expatriate basketball people in Uruguay
Basketball players from Charlotte, North Carolina
Charlotte 49ers men's basketball players
Ironi Nahariya players
Junior college men's basketball players in the United States
Torpan Pojat players
American men's basketball players
Forwards (basketball)